John Aitkenhead (8 October 1923 – 29 March 1987) was a Scottish footballer, who played for Queen's Park, Hibernian, Motherwell and Hamilton Academical. He also represented the Scottish Football League XI three times.

References

1923 births
1987 deaths
Footballers from South Lanarkshire
Scottish footballers
Association football wingers
Queen's Park F.C. players
Hibernian F.C. players
Motherwell F.C. players
Hamilton Academical F.C. players
Scottish Football League players
Scottish Football League representative players
People from Blantyre, South Lanarkshire